Unity Football Club is a Canadian semi-professional soccer club based in Langley, British Columbia that plays in League1 British Columbia.

History
The club was officially unveiled on November 22, 2021, as an inaugural license holder for the first season of the new semi-professional League1 British Columbia in 2022. The team was formed in partnership with Trinity Western University and their Spartans sports teams with the head coaches of both the TWU men's and women's soccer teams being involved with the club. 

Their inaugural matches occurred on May 22 on the road against TSS FC Rovers for both the male and female teams. The women's team recorded the club's first ever victory, defeating the Rovers 2-1.

Seasons

Men

Women

References

Soccer clubs in British Columbia
Unity
Association football clubs established in 2021
2021 establishments in British Columbia